Amnesiac is the fifth studio album by the English rock band Radiohead, released on 30 May 2001 by EMI subsidiaries Parlophone and Capitol Records. It was recorded with the producer Nigel Godrich in the same sessions as Radiohead's previous album Kid A (2000); Radiohead split the work in two as they felt it was too dense for a double album. As with Kid A, Amnesiac incorporates influences from electronic music, 20th-century classical music, jazz and krautrock. The final track, "Life in a Glasshouse", is a collaboration with the jazz trumpeter Humphrey Lyttelton and his band.

After having released no singles for Kid A, Radiohead promoted Amnesiac with the singles "Pyramid Song" and "Knives Out", accompanied by music videos. Videos were also made for "Pulk/Pull Revolving Doors" and "Like Spinning Plates", and "I Might Be Wrong", which was released as a promotional single. In June 2001, Radiohead began the Amnesiac tour, incorporating their first North American tour in three years.

Amnesiac debuted at number one on the UK Albums Chart and number two on the US Billboard 200. By October 2008, it had sold over 900,000 copies worldwide. It is certified platinum in the UK, the US and Canada, and gold in Japan. Though some critics felt it was too experimental or less cohesive than Kid A, or saw it as a collection of outtakes, it received positive reviews; it was named one of the year's best albums by numerous publications.

Amnesiac was nominated for the Mercury Prize and several Grammy Awards, winning for Best Recording Package for the special edition. "Pyramid Song" was named one of the best tracks of the decade by Rolling Stone, NME and Pitchfork, and Rolling Stone ranked Amnesiac number 320 in their 2012 "500 Greatest Albums of All Time" list. Kid A Mnesia, an anniversary reissue compiling Kid A, Amnesiac and previously unreleased material, was released in 2021.

Recording

Radiohead and producer Nigel Godrich recorded Amnesiac during the same sessions as its predecessor, Kid A, released in October 2000. The sessions took place from January 1999 to mid-2000 in Guillaume Studios in Paris, Medley Studios in Copenhagen and Radiohead's studio in Oxfordshire. The drummer, Philip Selway, said the sessions had "two frames of mind ... a tension between our old approach of all being in a room playing together and the other extreme of manufacturing music in the studio. I think Amnesiac comes out stronger in the band-arrangement way."

The sessions drew influence from electronic music, 20th-century classical music, jazz and krautrock, using synthesisers, ondes Martenot, drum machines, strings and brass. The strings, arranged by the guitarist Jonny Greenwood, were performed by the Orchestra of St John's and recorded in Dorchester Abbey, a 12th-century church close to Radiohead's studio.

Radiohead considered releasing the work as a double album, but felt it was too dense. The singer, Thom Yorke, said Radiohead split it into two albums because "they cancel each other out as overall finished things. They come from two different places, I think ... In some weird way I think Amnesiac gives another take on Kid A, a form of explanation." The band stressed that they saw Amnesiac not as a collection of Kid A B-sides or outtakes but an album in its own right.

Tracks 
"Pulk/Pull Revolving Doors" began as an attempt to record another song, "True Love Waits". It features keyboard loops recorded during the OK Computer sessions; Radiohead disabled the erase heads on the tape recorders so that the tape repeatedly recorded over itself, creating a "ghostly" tape loop, and manipulated the results in Pro Tools. Deciding that the arrangement did not fit "True Love Waits", Radiohead used it to create a new track. Yorke added a spoken vocal and used the pitch-correcting software Auto-Tune to process it into melody. According to Yorke, Auto-Tune "desperately tries to search for the music in your speech, and produces notes at random. If you've assigned it a key, you've got music." The "True Love Waits" version of "Pulk/Pull Revolving Doors" was eventually released on the 2021 compilation Kid A Mnesia. Auto-Tune was also used to process Yorke's vocals on "Packt Like Sardines in a Crushd Tin Box", to create a "nasal, depersonalised sound".

For "You And Whose Army?", Radiohead attempted to capture the "soft, warm, proto-doowop sound" of the 1940s harmony group the Ink Spots. They muffled microphones with egg boxes and used the ondes Martenot's resonating palme diffuseur loudspeaker to treat the vocals. Unlike many tracks from the sessions, the band recorded it live; the guitarist Ed O'Brien said, "We rehearsed it a bit, not too much, then just went in and did it. It's just us doing our thing as a band."

According to a diary kept by O'Brien, "Knives Out" took over a year to complete. He said it was "the most straight-ahead thing we've done in years", and that the band been tempted to over-embellish it. It was influenced by the guitar work of Johnny Marr of the Smiths. "Dollars and Cents" was edited down from an eleven-minute jam, using an editing approach inspired by krautrock band Can. The bassist, Colin Greenwood, played a jazz record by Alice Coltrane over the recording, inspiring his brother Jonny to write a "Coltrane-style" string arrangement.

"Like Spinning Plates" was the result of Radiohead's attempt to record another song, "I Will", on synthesiser. Dismissing the recording as "dodgy Kraftwerk", Radiohead reversed it and created a new song. Yorke said: "I was in another room, heard the vocal melody coming backwards, and thought, 'That's miles better than the right way round', then spent the rest of the night trying to learn the melody." Yorke sang the lyrics backwards; this recording was in turn reversed, creating vocals with lyrics that sound reversed. Radiohead recorded "I Will" in a new arrangement for their next album, Hail to the Thief (2003).

For the final track, "Life in a Glasshouse", Jonny Greenwood wrote to the jazz trumpeter Humphrey Lyttelton, explaining that Radiohead were "a bit stuck". Lyttelton agreed to perform on the song with his band after his daughter showed him Radiohead's 1997 album OK Computer. According to Lyttelton, Radiohead "didn't want it to sound like a slick studio production but a slightly exploratory thing of people playing as if they didn't have it all planned out in advance". The song was recorded over seven hours, and left Lyttelton exhausted. "I detected some sort of eye-rolling at the start of the session, as if to say we were miles apart," he said. "They went through quite a few nervous breakdowns during the course of it all, just through trying to explain to us all what they wanted."

Music and lyrics

Amnesiac incorporates elements of experimental rock, electronica, alternative rock and jazz. Colin Greenwood said it contained "traditional Radiohead-type songs" alongside more experimental work. The Atlantic contrasted it with "the surgical glint" of Kid A, with "swampy and foggy" arrangements and "uneasy" chords and rhythms.

The first track, "Packt Like Sardines in a Crushd Tin Box", is an electronic song with synthesisers and metallic percussion. "Pyramid Song", a swung ballad with piano and strings, was inspired by the Charles Mingus song "Freedom". Its lyrics were inspired by an exhibition of ancient Egyptian underworld art Yorke attended while the band was recording in Copenhagen and ideas of cyclical time discussed by Stephen Hawking and Buddhism.

Yorke said "You and Whose Army?" was "about someone who is elected into power by people and who then blatantly betrays them – just like Blair did". The song builds slowly on piano, before reaching a climax in the final minute. According to O'Brien, "In the Radiohead of old, on OK Computer, that break would have lasted four minutes. We would have carried on 'Hey Jude'-style."

"I Might Be Wrong" combines a "venomous" guitar riff with a "trance-like metallic beat". Colin Greenwood's bassline was inspired by the Chic bassist Bernard Edwards. The lyrics were influenced by advice given to Yorke by his partner, Rachel Owen: "Be proud of what you've done. Don't look back and just carry on like nothing's happened. Just let the bad stuff go." "Knives Out", described as the album's most conventional song, features "drifting" guitar lines, "driving" percussion, a "wandering" bassline, "haunting" vocals and "eerie" lyrics.

"Morning Bell/Amnesiac" is an alternative version of "Morning Bell" from Kid A; The Atlantic described it as a blend of "cosiness and nausea". O'Brien said that Radiohead often record and abandon different versions of songs, but that this version was "strong enough to bear hearing again". Yorke wrote that it was included "because it came from such a different place ... Because we only found it again by accident after having forgotten about it. Because it sounds like a recurring dream. It felt right." He said the lyrics for "Dollars and Cents" were "gibberish", but were inspired by the notion that "people are basically just pixels on a screen, unknowingly serving this higher power which is manipulative and destructive".

"Hunting Bears" is a short instrumental on electric guitar and synthesiser. "Life in a Glasshouse" features the Humphrey Lyttelton Band playing in the style of a New Orleans jazz funeral. According to Lyttelton, the song starts with "ad-libbed, bluesy, minor-key meandering, then it gradually gets so that we're sort of playing real wild, primitive, New Orleans blues stuff". The lyrics were inspired by a news story Yorke read of a celebrity's wife so harassed by paparazzi that she papered her windows with their photographs.

Artwork and packaging
The Amnesiac artwork was created by Yorke and the longtime Radiohead collaborator Stanley Donwood. For inspiration, Donwood explored London taking notes, likening the city to the labyrinth of Greek mythology. He scanned blank pages of old books and superimposed onto them photos of fireworks and Tokyo tower blocks, copies of Piranesi's Imaginary Prisons drawings, and lyrics and phrases printed by Yorke on a broken typewriter.

The cover depicts a book cover with a weeping minotaur. The minotaur, a motif of the Amnesiac artwork, represents the "maze" Yorke felt he had become lost in during his depression after OK Computer; Donwood described it as a "tragic figure". Other figures depicted in the artwork include faceless terrorists, self-serving politicians and corporate executives. Yorke said they represented "the abstracted, semi-comical, stupidly dark, false voices that battled us as we tried to work".

For the special edition, Donwood designed a package with a hardback CD case in the style of a mislaid library book. He imagined that "someone made these pages in a book and it went into drawer in a desk and was forgotten about in the attic ... And visually and musically the album is about finding the book and opening the pages." The special edition won a Grammy Award for Best Recording Package at the 44th Grammy Awards.

Release 
Radiohead announced Amnesiac on their website in January 2001, three months after the release of Kid A. It was released in Japan on 30 May by EMI, in the UK on 4 June by Parlophone and in the US on 5 June by Capitol, both subsidiaries of EMI. After having released no singles from Kid A, Radiohead released two from Amnesiac: "Pyramid Song" in May and "Knives Out" in July, backed by music videos. Two music videos were created for "I Might Be Wrong", which was released as a radio-only single in June.

Radiohead reworked "Pulk/Pull Revolving Doors" and "Like Spinning Plates" for a computer-animated music video directed by Johnny Hardstaff. The video premiered on November 29, 2001, at an animation festival at the Centre For Contemporary Arts, Glasgow. It features imagery of killer whales swimming under UV light, a machine taking shape, and conjoined babies spinning in a centrifuge. The video received little airplay from MTV, who felt it was "of a sensitive nature" and would only broadcast it with a warning. Hardstaff said: "The irony is that you can't move on MTV for bland R&B and the empty boasts of 'artists' effectively fixated with their own flaccid showbiz cocks, but any piece of film with an ounce of real emotion isn't going to get seen."

Radiohead first performed Amnesiac songs on the Kid A tour, which began in June 2000. Radiohead performed the electronic tracks using rock instrumentation; for example, Yorke performed "Like Spinning Plates" as a piano ballad. On 10 June 2001, Radiohead recorded a concert for a special hour-long episode of the BBC show Later... with Jools Holland, including a performance of "Life in a Glasshouse" with the Humphrey Lyttelton Band. The Amnesiac tour began on 18 June, incorporating Radiohead's first North American tour in three years. Recordings from the Kid A and Amnesiac tours are included on I Might Be Wrong: Live Recordings, released in November 2001.

Sales 
Amnesiac debuted at number one on the UK Albums Chart. On the US Billboard 200, it debuted at number two, with sales of 231,000, surpassing the 207,000 first-week sales of Kid A. It was certified gold by the Recording Industry Association of Japan for shipments of 100,000 copies across Japan. By October 2008, Amnesiac had sold more than 900,000 copies worldwide. In July 2013, it was certified platinum in the UK for sales of more than 300,000.

Reception

After Radiohead's previous album, Kid A, had divided listeners, many hoped Amnesiac would return to their earlier rock sound. The Guardian titled its review "Relax: it's nothing like Kid A". However, Rolling Stone saw Amnesiac as a further distancing from Radiohead's earlier "Britpop-like" style, and Pitchfork found that it was nothing like Radiohead's 1995 album The Bends. Stylus wrote that although Amnesiac was "slightly more straightforward" than Kid A, it "solidified the postmillennial model of Radiohead: less songs and more atmosphere, more eclectic and electronic, more paranoid, more threatening, more sublime".

Robert Hilburn of the Los Angeles Times felt that Amnesiac, compared to Kid A, was "a richer, more engaging record, its austerity and troubled vision enriched by a rousing of the human spirit". The Guardian critic Alexis Petridis, who had disliked Kid A, felt that Amnesiac returned Radiohead to "their role as the world's most intriguing and innovative major rock band ... [It] strikes a cunning and rewarding balance between experimentation and quality control. It's hardly easy to digest but nor is it impossible to swallow." He criticised the electronic tracks "Pulk/Pull Revolving Doors" and "Like Spinning Plates" as self-indulgent, but praised the album's "haunting musical shifts and unconventional melodies". The Guardian named it "CD of the week". Stylus wrote that it was "an excellent disc", but was not as "exploratory or interesting" as Kid A.

Some dismissed Amnesiac as a collection of Kid A outtakes. The Pitchfork critic Ryan Schreiber wrote that its "questionable sequencing ... does little to hush the argument that the record is merely a thinly veiled B-sides compilation". Another Pitchfork writer, Scott Plagenhoef, felt the sequencing worked by creating tension, heightening the power of the more experimental tracks. However, he felt the more conventional marketing created a sense of "ordinariness" compared to Kid A and the impression that Radiohead had bowed to pressure from their record label.

Some critics felt Amnesiac was less cohesive than Kid A. The AllMusic critic Stephen Thomas Erlewine wrote that it "often plays as a hodgepodge", and that both albums "clearly derive from the same source and have the same flaws ... The division only makes the two records seem unfocused, even if the best of both records is quite stunning." Another AllMusic critic, Sam Samuelson, said Amnesiac was a "thrown-together" release that might have been better packaged with the live album I Might Be Wrong as a "complete Kid A sessions package". Schreiber, however, felt the "highlights were undeniably worth the wait, and easily overcome its occasional patchiness".

Reviewing the 2009 reissue for Pitchfork, Plagenhoef wrote: "More than Kid A – and maybe more than any other LP of its time – Amnesiac is the kickoff of a messy, rewarding era ... disconnected, self-aware, tense, eclectic, head-turning – an overload of good ideas inhibited by rules, restrictions, and conventional wisdom." In 2021, on the album's 20th anniversary, The Atlantic wrote that Amnesiac might be Radiohead's best work: "Listening to it 20 years after its release, the album's grumpy wisdom—its dignity in the face of dread—feels more moving than ever."

Accolades
Amnesiac was nominated for the 2001 Mercury Music Prize, losing to PJ Harvey's Stories from the City, Stories from the Sea, for which Yorke provided guest vocals. It was the fourth consecutive Radiohead album nominated for a Grammy Award for Best Alternative Music Album, and the special edition won a Grammy Award for Best Recording Package at the 44th Grammy Awards.

Several publications named Amnesiac one of the best albums of 2001, including Q, The Wire, Rolling Stone, Kludge, the Village Voice, Pazz and Jop, the Los Angeles Times, and Alternative Press. In 2005, Stylus named it the best album of the decade that far. In 2009, Pitchfork ranked Amnesiac the 34th best album of the 2000s and Rolling Stone ranked it the 25th. It is included in the 2005 book 1001 Albums You Must Hear Before You Die, and number 320 in the 2012 edition of Rolling Stone's "500 Greatest Albums of All Time" list. "Pyramid Song" was ranked among the best tracks of the decade by Rolling Stone, NME and Pitchfork.

Reissues

Radiohead left EMI after their contract ended in 2003. In 2007, EMI released Radiohead Box Set, a compilation of albums recorded while Radiohead were signed to EMI, including Amnesiac. After a period of being out of print on vinyl, Amnesiac was reissued as a double LP on 19 August 2008 as part of the "From the Capitol Vaults" series, along with other Radiohead albums. 

On 25 August, EMI reissued Amnesiac in a two-CD "Collector's Edition" and a "Special Collector's Edition" containing an additional DVD. The first CD contains the original studio album; the second CD collects B-sides from Amnesiac singles and live performances; the DVD contains music videos and a live television performance. Radiohead had no input into the reissues and the music was not remastered. The EMI reissues were discontinued after Radiohead's back catalogue was transferred to XL Recordings in 2016. In May 2016, XL reissued Radiohead's back catalogue on vinyl, including Amnesiac.

An early demo of "Life in a Glasshouse", performed by Yorke on acoustic guitar, was released on the 2019 compilation MiniDiscs [Hacked]. On November 5, 2021, Radiohead released Kid A Mnesia, an anniversary reissue compiling Kid A and Amnesiac. It includes a third album, Kid Amnesiae, comprising previously unreleased material from the sessions. Radiohead promoted the reissue with two digital singles, the previously unreleased tracks "If You Say the Word" and "Follow Me Around". Kid A Mnesia Exhibition, an interactive experience with music and artwork from the albums, was released on 18 November for PlayStation 5, macOS and Windows.

Track listing

Personnel
Adapted from the Amnesiac liner notes.

Radiohead
 Colin Greenwood
 Jonny Greenwood
 Ed O'Brien
 Philip Selway
 Thom Yorke

Additional musicians
 The Orchestra of St John's – strings 
 John Lubbock – conducting
 The Humphrey Lyttelton Band 
 Humphrey Lyttelton – trumpet, bandleader
 Jimmy Hastings – clarinet
 Pete Strange – trombone
 Paul Bridge – double bass
 Adrian Macintosh – drums

Technical personnel
 Nigel Godrich – production, engineering
 Radiohead – production
 Dan Grech-Marguerat – engineering 
 Gerard Navarro – engineering assistance
 Graeme Stewart – engineering assistance
 Bob Ludwig – mastering

Artwork
 Stanley Donwood – pictures, design
 Thom Yorke (credited as "Tchocky") – pictures

Charts

Weekly charts

Year-end charts

Certifications

References

External links
 Official Radiohead website
 
 Ed's Diary: Ed O'Brien's studio diary from Kid A / Amnesiac recording sessions, 1999–2000 (archived at Green Plastic)

2001 albums
Parlophone albums
Radiohead albums
Albums produced by Nigel Godrich
Experimental rock albums
Electronica albums by British artists